Rivetina is a genus of praying mantises in the family Rivetinidae.

The genus Rivetina contains species of the ground mantis, native to Europe, Asia and Africa.

Species
The following species are recognised in the genus Rivetina:
Rivetina asiatica Mistshenko, 1967
Rivetina baetica  Rambur, 1839  (Ground Mantis)
Rivetina balcanica Kaltenbach, 1963
Rivetina beybienkoi  Lindt, 1961
Rivetina buettikeri  Kaltenbach, 1982
Rivetina byblica  La Greca & Lombardo, 1982
Rivetina caucasica  Saussure, 1871
Rivetina compacta  Lindt, 1980
Rivetina crassa  Mistshenko, 1949
Rivetina dentata  Mistshenko, 1967
Rivetina deserta  Mistshenko, 1967
Rivetina dolichoptera  Schulthess, 1894
Rivetina elegans  Mistshemko, 1967
Rivetina excellens  La Greca & Lombardo, 1982
Rivetina fasciata  Thunberg, 1815
Rivetina feisabadica  Lindt, 1961
Rivetina gigantea  Kaltenbach, 1991
Rivetina gigas  Saussure, 1871
Rivetina grandis  Saussure, 1872
Rivetina inermis  Uvarov, 1922
Rivetina iranica  La Greca & Lombardo, 1982
Rivetina karadumi  Lindt, 1961
Rivetina karateginica  Lindt, 1961
Rivetina laticollis  La Greca & Lombardo, 1982
Rivetina monticola  Mistshenko, 1956
Rivetina nana  Mistshenko, 1967
Rivetina pallida  Kaltenbach, 1984
Rivetina parva  Lindt, 1980
Rivetina pulisangini  Lindt, 1968
Rivetina rhombicollis  La Greca & Lombardo, 1982
Rivetina similis  Lindt, 1980
Rivetina syriaca  Saussure, 1869
Rivetina tarda  Lindt, 1980
Rivetina varsobica  Lindt, 1968

See also

Ground Mantis
List of mantis genera and species
Mantodea by location

References

 
Mantodea genera
Mantidae
Taxa named by Lucien Berland
Taxa named by Lucien Chopard